Vinton Sings Vinton is a nine-track collection of songs recorded by Bobby Vinton, all written or co-written by Vinton himself. It was released in late 1970. It contains five previously recorded songs and four new songs. The song "Kristie" was written for Vinton's daughter Kristin (his second child).
"Beat of my heart" "Kristie"and "Where is love "are first appeared in stereo.

Track listing

References                 

1970 compilation albums
Bobby Vinton compilation albums
Harmony Records compilation albums